Weißenberg  (German) or Wóspork (Upper Sorbian) is a town in the district of Bautzen, in Saxony, Germany. The Upper Lusatian town has approximately 3100 inhabitants and is part of the recognized Sorbian settlement area in Saxony.

Geography 
Weißenberg is located 16 km east of Bautzen/Budyšin in the region of Lusatia. The town borders Malschwitz/Malešecy and Hohendubrau in the north, Vierkirchen and Löbau in the south, and Hochkirch and Kubschütz in the west. It also borders the district of Görlitz. It's near to the border to the Czech Republic and Poland.

Subdivisions 
 Belgern (Sorbian Běła Hora, which means "white mountain") with Neubelgern (Nowa Běła Hora), 88 inhabitants
 Cortnitz (Chortnica), 42 inhabitants
 Drehsa (Droždźij), 234 inhabitants
 Gröditz (Hrodźišćo), 246 inhabitants
 Grube (Jama), 27 inhabitants
 Kotitz (Kotecy), 193 inhabitants
 Lauske  (Łusk), 139 inhabitants
 Maltitz (Malećicy) with Wasserkretscham (Wodowa korčma), 265 inhabitants
 Nechern '(Njechorń), 123 inhabitants
 Nostitz (Nosaćicy), 174 inhabitants
 Särka (Žarki), 166 inhabitants
 Spittel (Špikały), 53 inhabitants
 Weicha (Wichowy), 98 inhabitants
 Wuischke  (Wuježk), 53 inhabitants
 Wurschen (Worcyn), 312 inhabitants

The actual town of Weißenberg has 977 inhabitants.

 History 

Weißenberg was founded in 1228 at the Via Regia by Ottokar I of Bohemia and it used to be called Wizenburg, referring to the city's white castle.

In 1625, the town was able to buy its freedom from its noble masters for 8,500 thalers, but Weißenberg still had to accept a knightly patron.

Today's district of Wurschen is engraved on the Arc de Triomphe in Paris, since the Battle of Bautzen (1813) on May 20th and 21st.

In the 18th century, Weißenberg was still mentioned as a largely Sorbian-inhabited market town, with all residents also speaking German. In the 1880s Arnošt Muka determined a population of 1242, including 300 Sorbs (24%). In 1893 the regular Sorbian services in the Weißenberg church were abolished. 1956, Ernst Tschernik counted a Sorbian-speaking population of only 5.8%, a total of 81 speakers. Today, the Sorbian community in Weißenberg is a big minority.

On April 17, 1945, the battlefield of World War II came to Weißenberg for the first time, when Soviet artillery shelled the town's train station. The following day Weißenberg was occupied by Soviet troops.

From 1952 to 1990, Weißenberg was part of the Bezirk Dresden of East Germany.

 Sights 
 Castle of Gröditz
 Kotitz: Evangelical church with Jan-Kilian-monument
 Riegelmühle in Nechern
 Church of Nostitz
 The museum Alte Pfefferküchlerei shows how the traditional Pfefferkuchen are made
 Castle of Wurschen

 Education 
There are two schools in Weißenberg; a 'Grundschule' and a 'Mittelschule'.

 Notable people 
 Pawoł Nedo (1908–1984), educator and anthropologist Sorbian, Chairman of the Domowina
 Benno von Heynitz (1924–2010), resistance fighter and lawyer, founder of Bautzen Committee e. V. and the Bautzen Memorial
 Wolfgang Beyer, city historian and former director of the outpatient clinic

In fiction
In James P. Hogan's science fiction novel The Proteus Operation'', Weißenberg was the location of a time machine in Nazi Germany.

Twin towns
 Deckenpfronn (1990)

Weblinks 

 
 Website of Weißenberg
 Interactive 360° panorama of Weißenbergs, Marktplatz

References 

Towns in Saxony
Populated places in Bautzen (district)